The Ajmer–Durg Express or Durg Express is a weekly Express train connecting Ajmer, the major city of Rajasthan and Durg, a town in Chhattisgarh.
The train totally covers the most of almost half portion of Madhya Pradesh from West Central to East.

Number and nomenclature
The number provided for the train are:

 18207 Ajmer–Durg Weekly Express
 18208 Ajmer–Durg Weekly Express
 18213 Ajmer–Durg Weekly Express
 18214 Ajmer–Durg Weekly Express

Route

Coach composition
This train runs with I lhb coach.

 SLRD  eog Class – 2
 Sleeper class – 12
 Second Class (unreserved) – 2
 AC 3 Tier – 3
 AC 2 Tier – 2 ha1 1

Speed and frequency
The train runs on a weekly basis with average speed 60 km/h.

External links
 JAIPUR DURUG EXPRESS TIMINGS

Rail transport in Rajasthan
Rail transport in Madhya Pradesh
Rail transport in Chhattisgarh
Transport in Durg
Express trains in India
Transport in Ajmer